The FIFA Club World Cup is an international association football competition organised by the Fédération Internationale de Football Association (FIFA), the sport's global governing body. The championship was first contested as the FIFA Club World Championship in 2000. It was not held between 2001 and 2004 due to a combination of factors, most importantly the collapse of FIFA's marketing partner International Sport and Leisure. Following a change in format which saw the FIFA Club World Championship absorb the Intercontinental Cup, it was relaunched in 2005 and took its current name the season afterwards.

The current format of the tournament involves seven teams competing for the title at venues within the host nation over a period of about two weeks; the winners of that year's edition of the Asian AFC Champions League, African CAF Champions League, North American CONCACAF Champions League, South American Copa Libertadores, Oceanian OFC Champions League and European UEFA Champions League, along with the host nation's national champion, participate in a straight knockout tournament.

At the end of each FIFA World Cup final tournament, several awards are attributed to the players and teams which have distinguished themselves from the rest in different aspects of the game. Spanish club Barcelona has been the only club to earn every award in one edition, a feat accomplished during the 2015 FIFA Club World Cup. Barcelona, along with Real Madrid, are also the only sides to have earned three FIFA Fair Play Trophies. Lionel Messi is also the only player to have won two Golden Ball awards. Uruguayan player Luis Suárez holds the record for the most goals scored in one edition (five in 2015).

Awards
There are currently three awards:

the Golden Ball for best player;
the Man of the Match for the best player in each tournament match; first awarded in 2013;
the FIFA Fair Play Trophy for the team with the best record of fair play.

The following two awards are no longer given:
the Golden Shoe for best player; only awarded in 2000;
the FIFA All-Star Team for the best squad of players of the tournament; only awarded in 2000.

The winners of the competition also receive the FIFA Club World Cup Champions Badge; it features an image of the trophy, which the reigning champion is entitled to display on its kit until the final of the next championship. The badge was first presented to Milan, the winners of the 2007 final. Initially, all four previous champions were allowed to wear the badge until the 2008 final, where Manchester United gained the sole right to wear the badge by winning the trophy.

Each player from the clubs finishing third, second and first also receive one bronze, silver and gold medal each, respectively.

Golden Ball

The Golden Ball award is presented to the best player at each FIFA Club World Cup, with a shortlist drawn up by the FIFA technical committee and the winner voted for by representatives of the media. Those who finish as runners-up in the vote receive the Silver Ball and Bronze Ball awards as the second and third most outstanding players in the tournament respectively.
 Real Madrid (Sergio Ramos – 2014, Cristiano Ronaldo – 2016, Luka Modrić – 2017, Gareth Bale – 2018, Vinícius Júnior – 2022) is the only club to have earned the Golden Ball award five times.
 Barcelona is the only club to have earned every award in one edition (2015 Japan).
 Lionel Messi is the only player to have won two Golden Balls.
 Cristiano Ronaldo has won most awards (4), one Golden Ball and three Silver Balls.
 Brazilian players have won the most Golden Balls, amassing six. They also hold the record for the most Silver and Bronze Balls with six and five, respectively.
 Cristian Bolaños, Dioko Kaluyituka, Mouhcine Iajour, Gaku Shibasaki and Ivan Vicelich are the only non-European and non-South American players who have earned the Silver Ball or the Bronze Ball while playing for a club that doesn't come from the aforementioned continents.

From 2005 to 2021, the winner of the Golden Ball was also presented with a separate trophy by the tournament sponsor. This was discontinued from the 2022 edition. The name of the award has varied:
 2005–2014: Toyota Award (also known as the Toyota Golden Key)
 During this period, the winner of the Toyota Award received a Toyota-made automobile as a prize or an equivalent amount in cash.
 2015: Alibaba E-Auto Award
 2016: Alibaba YunOS Auto Award
 2017–2021: Alibaba Cloud Award (also known as the Alibaba Cloud Trophy or Alibaba Cloud Player of the Tournament)

Man of the Match
The Man of the Match award was introduced in 2013 FIFA Club World Cup in Morocco. The award is given to the best player in each tournament match by the FIFA Technical Study Group.

Six players have won two man of the match awards:
 Four players won them in the same tournament: Luis Suárez (2015), Jonathan Urretaviscaya (2017), Khalid Eisa (2018) and Vinícius Júnior (2022).
 Two players won them in separate tournaments: Luka Modrić and Cristiano Ronaldo (both 2016 and 2017).
 Cristiano Ronaldo is the only player to have won two final man of the match awards.

The name of the award has varied based on the tournament sponsor:
2013–2014: Toyota Match Award
2015: Alibaba E-Auto Match Award
2016: Alibaba YunOS Auto Match Award
2017–2021: Alibaba Cloud Match Award
2022–present: Man of the Match presented by Visit Saudi

FIFA Fair Play Trophy
The FIFA Fair Play Trophy is given to the team with the best record of fair play during the Club World Cup tournament. The winners of this award earn the FIFA Fair Play Award, a diploma, a fair play medal for each player and official, and $50,000 worth of football equipment to be used for youth development.

Real Madrid is the only club to have won four FIFA Fair Play Trophies.

Golden Shoe
The Golden Shoe award went to the top goalscorer of the FIFA Club World Cup. It was only awarded at the inaugural tournament in 2000. If more than one player finishes the tournament with the same number of goals, the tie goes to the player who has contributed the most assists (with the FIFA Technical Study Group deciding whether an assist is to be counted as such). Silver and Bronze Boots are awarded to the second- and third-placed players.

FIFA All-Star Team
The FIFA All-Star Team is a squad of the best players of the tournament. It was only awarded at the inaugural tournament in 2000. The squad includes eleven starters and seven substitutes.

Hat-tricks
 Luis Suárez, Cristiano Ronaldo, Gareth Bale and Hamdou Elhouni are the only players who have scored a hat-trick in the competition. Suárez did so in the 2015 semi-final against Guangzhou Evergrande Taobao where he scored all three goals of that match. Cristiano Ronaldo scored a hat-trick in the 2016 FIFA Club World Cup Final against Kashima Antlers, an equalizing penalty kick followed by two extra time goals. Gareth Bale scored a hat-trick in the 2018 semi-final against Kashima Antlers, where he scored all three of his team's goals before being substituted in less than an hour. Hamdou Elhouni scored the latest hat-trick in 2019 when Espérance de Tunis won 6–2 against Al-Sadd in the match for fifth place.

References

External links
  
  

awards
Club World Cup